Householder may refer to:

Householder, a person who is the head of a household
Householder (Buddhism), a Buddhist term most broadly referring to any layperson
Householder (surname), notable people with the surname
The Householder, a 1963 Indian English/Hindi language film
The Householder (novel), a 1960 novel by Ruth Prawer Jhabvala; basis for the film
Householder transformation, an algorithm in numerical linear algebra
Grihastha, the second phase of an individual's life in the Hindu ashrama system

See also
Head of the household (disambiguation)